Procapperia maculatus is a moth of the family Pterophoridae. It is found in Asia Minor and the Alps of France and Italy and the Pyrenees. It has also been recorded from Russia and Georgia.

The wingspan is 20–23 mm.

The larvae feed on Scutellaria alpina.

References

Moths described in 1865
Oxyptilini
Moths of Europe
Moths of Asia